Thomas Carr Frank (born March 21, 1965) is an American political analyst, historian, and journalist. He co-founded and edited The Baffler magazine. Frank is the author of the books What's the Matter with Kansas? (2004) and Listen, Liberal (2016), among others. From 2008 to 2010 he wrote "The Tilting Yard", a column in The Wall Street Journal.

A historian of culture and ideas, Frank analyzes trends in American electoral politics and propaganda, advertising, popular culture, mainstream journalism, and economics. His topics include the rhetoric and impact of culture wars in American political life and the relationship between politics, economics, and culture in the United States.

Early life
Frank was born in Kansas City, Missouri, and grew up in Mission Hills, Kansas. He graduated from Shawnee Mission East High School, and in 1988 from the University of Virginia with a Bachelor of Arts degree in history after transferring from the University of Kansas in his freshman year. Frank received a Master of Arts degree in history in 1990 and a doctorate in history in 1994 from the University of Chicago. His doctoral thesis on advertising in the 1960s, The Conquest of Cool: Business Culture, Counterculture, and the Rise of Hip Consumerism, was later published by the University of Chicago Press.

Politics
Frank was a College Republican, attending campus meetings at the University of Kansas, but became highly critical of conservatism, especially the presidency of George W. Bush. Frank summarized the thesis of his book The Wrecking Crew: How Conservatives Rule (2008) as "[b]ad government is the natural product of rule by those who believe government is bad."

Frank's other writings include essays for Harper's Magazine, Le Monde diplomatique, Bookforum, and the Financial Times. His book What's the Matter with Kansas? (2004) earned him nationwide and international recognition.

From December 2010 to February 2014, Frank wrote the monthly "Easy Chair" column for Harper's Magazine.

It received little attention at the time, but in Listen, Liberal: Or, What Ever Happened to the Party of the People? (2016), Frank was one of the few analysts who foresaw that Donald Trump could win the 2016 United States presidential election. In 2018, he called Trump "the worst politician ever", but maintained that Trump could be reelected in the 2020 presidential election. Frank further observes that "quasi-fascist movements" are springing up around the world.

Frank's research into U.S. populism was published as the book The People, No: A Brief History of Anti-Populism (2020). In it, he examines the origin of the term in the United States and discusses historical examples of populism and its adherents and detractors.

Personal life
Frank lives in Bethesda, Maryland, with his wife, Wendy Edelberg, and their children. He identifies as a left-wing populist and supported Bernie Sanders's campaigns for President of the United States in 2016 and 2020.

Works

Books

One Market Under God: Extreme Capitalism, Market Populism, and the End of Economic Democracy (2000) 
New Consensus for Old: Cultural Studies from Left to Right (2002) 
Boob Jubilee: The Cultural Politics of the New Economy (2003) 
What's the Matter with Kansas? How Conservatives Won the Heart of America (2004). Henry Holt and Co. 
What's the Matter with America? The Resistible Rise of the American Right (2006) 
The Wrecking Crew: How Conservatives Rule (2008), Henry Holt and Co. 
Pity the Billionaire: The Hard-Times Swindle and the Unlikely Comeback of the Right (2011) 
Listen, Liberal: Or, What Ever Happened to the Party of the People? (2016) 
Rendezvous with Oblivion: Reports from a Sinking Society (2018) 
 The People, No: A Brief History of Anti-Populism (2020)

Articles

See also
 What's the Matter with Kansas? (film)
 American Feud: A History of Conservatives and Liberals (film). Includes interviews with Frank speaking about "red states", "blue states" and other aspects of American politics.
 The Trap (TV Documentary Series). Frank appears in part two of the BBC documentary series.

References

Further reading
 
 
  (Response to Bartels)

External links

Tom Frank official website

 New Consensus for Old: Cultural Studies from Left to Right 26 page book/pamphlet put out by Prickly Paradigm in Fall 2002.
PBS's NOW with Bill Moyers An interview on What's the Matter With Kansas?

Frank giving speech at "Hostile Takeover"
VIDEO: Thomas Frank discusses Pity the Billionaire on January 5, 2012, on WGBH's Forum Network.

1965 births
Living people
Writers from Kansas City, Missouri
American book editors
American columnists
American political writers
People from Mission Hills, Kansas
University of Kansas alumni
University of Chicago alumni
University of Virginia alumni
20th-century American historians
American male non-fiction writers
21st-century American historians
American male essayists
20th-century American essayists
21st-century American essayists
20th-century American male writers
21st-century American male writers